Birchleigh is one of the northernmost suburbs of Kempton Park, in Gauteng province, South Africa. Located in the City of Ekurhuleni Metropolitan Municipality, the town has a population of 10,776 as of the 2011 census.

References

Suburbs of Kempton Park, Gauteng